Matt O'Gara is a former hurler from Toomevara, County Tipperary, Ireland.  He played his hurling with his local club Toomevara, and Tipperary as midfield and wing back. He enjoyed great success winning a senior county title in hurling in 1960 and three senior titles in football in 1958, 1959 and 1960. Matt O'Gara's place is guaranteed in the history books, not only for his heart, skill and speed, but also as the last All-Ireland winner to wear spectacles on the field of play! - a record surely not to be broken.

Playing career

Inter-county
O'Gara first came to prominence on the inter-county scene as a member of the Tipperary minor hurling team in 1955. That team defeated Galway in the minor hurling final in Croke Park.  O'Gara came on as a substitute for Joe Small of Borrisoleigh.

O'Gara’s performances at this level brought him to the attention of the senior team. In 1961 it was National League medal number one and Munster medal number one for O'Gara. In the subsequent All-Ireland final Tipp faced Dublin, however, in spite of being red-hot favourites, Tipp found the going tough. O'Gara contributed two very valuable points from play that day and Tipp eventually ran out winners by a single point. So, 1961 saw O'Gara capture his first All-Ireland senior hurling medal.

In 1962 Tipp were still the kingpins of Munster hurling with O'Gara capturing a second provincial medal. In the subsequent All-Ireland final against Wexford, O'Gara lined out at wing-back for Tipp and collected his second All-Ireland medal. Unfortunately Matt's inter-county career came to a premature end as he was forced to retire from hurling in 1963, following an injury during a hurling match in Boherlahan, Co. Tipperary.

Provincial
O'Gara was voted best new rookie in 1961 and narrowly failed to be selected on the Railway Cup team.

Honours
All-Ireland Senior Hurling Championship: 2 
1961, 1962
All-Ireland Minor Hurling Championship: 1
1955
Tipperary Senior Hurling Championship: 1 
1960
Tipperary Senior Football Championship: 3 
1958, 1959, 1960

References

Teams

Dual players
Tipperary inter-county hurlers
Toomevara hurlers
Year of birth missing (living people)
Possibly living people